Stigeoclonium is a genus of green algae in the family Chaetophoraceae.

Species list
 S. aestivale
 S. amoenum
 S. askenasyi
 S. attenuatum
 S. australense
 S. biasolettianum
 S. elongatum
 S. farctum
 S. fasciculare
 S. flagelliferum
 S. helveticum
 S. islamii
 S. longearticulatum
 S. longipilum
 S. lubricum
 S. nanum
 S. nudiusculum
 S. ovisporum
 S. pachydermum
 S. pascheri
 S. polymorphum
 S. protensum
 S. pusillum
 S. segarare
 S. setigerum
 S. simplex
 S. stagnatile
 S. subsecundum
 S. subuligerum
 S. tenue
 S. thermale
 S. tibeticum
 S. variabile

References

Chaetophorales genera
Chaetophoraceae